Manohar Trimbak Ajgaonkar (born 6 November 1954) is an Indian politician and member of the Bharatiya Janata Party. Ajgaonkar is a first term member of the Goa Legislative Assembly in 2007 from the  Dhargalim constituency in Pernem.

He started his career with Indian National Congress. He joined Bharatiya Janata Party in 2002 and won the seat. He returned to Indian National Congress in 2007 and retained the seat. He joined Maharashtrawadi Gomantak Party in 2017. He also declared his candidature from Pernem constituency in North Goa.

Ajgaonkar and Pauskar joined the Bharatiya Janata Party in March 2019 thus minimizing Maharashtrawadi Gomantak Party to one seat in the Goa Legislative Assembly. Ajgaonkar was appointed Deputy Chief Minister of Goa.

References 

1954 births
People from Margao
Bharatiya Janata Party politicians from Goa
Living people
Maharashtrawadi Gomantak Party politicians
Indian National Congress politicians from Goa
Goa MLAs 2017–2022
Deputy chief ministers of Goa
Goa MLAs 1999–2002
Goa MLAs 2002–2007
Goa MLAs 2007–2012